Chávez High School can refer to several schools in the United States:

Chávez Huerta K-12 Preparatory Academy (Pueblo, Colorado)
Chávez High School (Delano, California)
Chávez High School (Houston)
César Chávez High School (Phoenix, Arizona)
Chávez High School (Santa Ana, California)
Cesar Chavez High School (Stockton, California)
César Chávez Learning Academies (San Fernando, California)